Eagle Summit is a -tall gap through the White Mountains of central Alaska. The gap was named after the nearby Eagle River by prospectors from nearby Circle, Alaska.

Eagle Summit is the site of a convergence zone between the Yukon Flats to the north and the low ground of the Tanana Valley to the south. Any differential in the weather within the two valleys causes high winds and precipitation when there is moisture in the atmosphere. In 1916, Hudson Stuck, who was one of the first people to climb Denali's South Peak, wrote, "The Eagle Summit is one of the most difficult summits in Alaska. The wind blows so fiercely that sometimes for days together its passage is almost impossible. ... The snow smothers up everything on the lee side of the hill, and the end of every storm presents a new surface and an altered route. ... there is no easier pass and no way around."

It was for this latter reason that engineers chose Eagle Summit as the route to build the Steese Highway, which connects Fairbanks, Alaska to the Yukon River at Circle. In 1927, just 11 years after Stuck became one of the first Americans to navigate Eagle Summit on dog sled, the highway was completed and road travel over the summit became possible. Today, Eagle Summit still is the highest point on the highway and tourism guides recommend its scenic views. One side has one starring down cliffs, while the other resembles Antarctica in the winter months. Eagle Summit also experiences Midnight Sun around the time of the summer solstice despite being south of the Arctic Circle, due to its elevation.

The trail of the annual Yukon Quest 1,000-mile sled dog race also passes over Eagle Summit. The area's high winds, drifting snow, and steep terrain make it the most difficult section of trail in the race, and some competitors have called it the most difficult section of trail in any sled dog race in the world. In 2006, a fierce storm atop Eagle Summit caused whiteout conditions that forced seven mushers and dog teams to be evacuated via helicopter from the mountain. Partially because of the storm, only 11 mushers finished the race — the fewest in Yukon Quest history.

Notes 

Mountain passes of Alaska
Landforms of Yukon–Koyukuk Census Area, Alaska
Yukon Quest